Lake Rabisha (Rabishko ezero) is the largest inland natural freshwater lake in Bulgaria. It is located in northwestern Bulgaria, between the villages of Rabisha and Tolovitsa in Belogradchik municipality, Vidin Province. The lake is abundant in fish. There are sheatfishes that can reach 300 kilograms of weight. The lake is near the famous Magura Cave, which is one of the largest caves in Bulgaria.

References

Rabisha
Rabisha
Belogradchik Municipality